Oo Na... Mahal Na Kung Mahal is a Filipino coming-of-age/romantic comedy film produced by Star Cinema in 1999.

It features the soundtrack "Oo na Mahal na Kung Mahal Kita" performed by the band Frasco and later covered by Parokya ni Edgar (re-titling it as "Wag Mo Na Sana"). It was originally composed by Frasco members Francis Mortiz and Erwin Romulo, contrary to the popular belief that it was Chito Miranda.

Cast

Main cast
John Lloyd Cruz as Igi Boy
Baron Geisler as Ivan
Marc Solis as Enad
Kaye Abad as Miles
Kristine Hermosa as Chrissie
Nikki Valdez as Sally

Supporting cast
Elizabeth Oropesa as Mely
Ronaldo Valdez as Tito Paul
Tommy Abuel as Col. Ruiz
Yoyong Martirez as Enad's father
Bonggoy Manahan as Uncle Manny
Manny Castañeda as Mr. Carpio
Bibeth Orteza as Enad's mother
Miguel dela Rosa as Enad's older brother
Gino Paul Guzman as Miles's older brother

Cameos
Gary Lising as himself
Bearwin Meily as Bearwin
Patrick Garcia as Patrick
Jodi Sta. Maria as Patrick's girl
Tracy Vergel as Bearwin's girl 1
Desiree del Valle as Bearwin's girl 2
Bentong as Col. Ruiz's ka-barkada
Boyong Baytion as Philip (Col. Ruiz's ka-barkada)

External links
 

Star Cinema films
Philippine romantic comedy films
1999 films
Tagalog-language films